Pur Ashraf Sheykh Makan castle is a historical castle located in Darreh Shahr County in Ilam Province, The longevity of this fortress dates back to the 1335 AH.

References 

Castles in Iran